Chetna is a 1970 Bollywood drama film directed by B.R. Ishara. The film stars Shatrughan Sinha, Anil Dhawan and Rehana Sultan. The film focuses on the subject of rehabilitation of prostitutes. However, the film is more famous for its bold scenes of the actress Rehana Sultan. The film virtually ended her film career as she was typecast thereafter.

One of its songs, "Main To Har Mod Par Tujhko Doonga Sada," is singer Mukesh's all-time memorable and popular song.

Plot
Anil is shy and reclusive and is introduced to a beautiful prostitute named Seema through his friend, Ramesh. Anil and Seema become good friends through their increasing patience, acceptance, and understanding of each other's ways. They eventually fall in love.

One day, Anil proposes to Seema, and although Seema is happy about this, she's very reluctant in taking the decision to proceed with him because she's not sure whether she can lead a normal life after marriage. Still, she accepts the proposal, and Anil offers her to stay with him for some time before she marries him. Seema becomes convinced that Anil truly loves her, and that she can actually lead a normal life with him. She starts to plan for her marriage, and, during that time, a matter comes up in which Anil has to go out of town for a few days.

When he returns, he returns to an unrecognizable Seema. Seema takes up drinking, smoking, and develops a very nonchalant and distant attitude towards him. He wonders what might have happened to her during his absence. Unbeknownst to him, Seema discovers that she is pregnant and she doesn't know who the father is. Not wanting Anil to be ridiculed and cursed by society, she poisons herself.

Cast
Anil Dhawan as Anil  
Shatrughan Sinha as Ramesh 
Rehana Sultan as Seema 
Nadira as Nirmala 
Laxmi Chhaya   
Asit Sen   
Manmohan Krishna as Dr. Mehra 
Johnny Whisky 
Master Amir

Music
The musical score for the film was composed by Sapan-Jagmohan. The lyrics were written by Naqsh Lyallpuri.

References

External links
 

1970 films
1970s Hindi-language films
1970s action films
Films about prostitution in India
Films scored by Sapan-Jagmohan
Films directed by B. R. Ishara